Marco Chiudinelli was the defending champion but chose not to defend his title.

Jürgen Melzer won the title after defeating Michał Przysiężny 6–4, 6–3 in the final.

Seeds

Draw

Finals

Top half

Bottom half

References
Main Draw
Qualifying Draw

Wroclaw Open - Singles
Wrocław Open